Lower Assam division is one of the 5 administrative divisions of Assam. It was formed in 1874, comprising Undivided Kamrup district of Western Assam, undivided Darrang and Nagoan districts of Central Assam and Khasi & Jaintia hills of Meghalaya, created for revenue purposes. The division is under the jurisdiction of a Commissioner, who is stationed at Guwahati. The division currently covers Western Brahmaputa Valley. Shri Jayant Narlikar,IAS is the current Commissioner of Lower Assam division.

Districts
Lower Assam division comprises 12 districts, namely Dhubri, South Salamara, Kokrajhar, Chirang, Bongaigaon, Goalpara, Barpeta, Bajali, Nalbari, Baksa, Kamrup and Kamrup metropolitan. Among these, 3 districts namely Kokrajhar, Chirang and Baksa falls within Bodoland
 

# Districts within the Bodoland Territorial Region

Demographics
As per 2011 census, Lower Assam division has a population of 11,252,365

Languages

 
According to 2011 census, the total number of Assamese speakers in the division were 59,61,583, Bengali speakers were 34,76,953, Boro speakers were 8,70,198 and Hindi speakers were 3,17,958. Although the Bengali speaking population was 30.9% as per as 2011 census language census report, but Lower Assam Division is home to a large Muslim population of Bengali origin, most of whom now identify as Assamese speakers in the census.

Muslims compromised around 47.5% of the total lower Assam population as of 2011 Census.

See also
Upper Assam Division

References

Divisions of Assam